Medranda is a municipality located in the province of Guadalajara, Castile-La Mancha, Spain. According to the 2004 census (INE), the municipality has a population of 96 inhabitants.

References

External links
 Official Castilla-La Mancha tourism web page
 Pueblos Espana page

Municipalities in the Province of Guadalajara